Thomas Worthington (11 April 1826 – 9 November 1909) was a 19th-century English architect, particularly associated with public buildings in and around Manchester. Worthington's preferred style was the Gothic Revival.

Early life
Worthington was born in Crescent Parade, Crescent, Salford, Lancashire, on 11 April 1826. He was the fourth of six sons of a Salford Unitarian cotton merchant, also called Thomas, and his second wife Susanna (1792–1869). He left school, aged 14, and was articled to Henry Bowman, architect (Bowman & Crowther). Before he was twenty he had won two medals: one for a church design (Royal Society of Arts) and one for an essay on "Brick" (Royal Institute of British Architects). After completing his articles in 1847, he assisted William Tite who was building Carlisle railway station. On the suspension of this work in 1848, he went on an eight-month study tour to France, Italy and Switzerland accompanied by a friend, Henry A. Darbishire. Their journey took them through Tuscany, Latium and Campania; Worthington's notes and sketches from the trip provided him with a first-hand knowledge of Italian Gothic and Renaissance architecture, which give him inspiration for his own later work.

After returning to Manchester in October 1848, Worthington spent a short time gaining experience of quantity surveying, before opening his own architectural practice in King Street the following year.

Social concerns
Worthington was strongly influenced by his Unitarian upbringing, becoming committed to social reform and joining numerous learned societies, including the Manchester Literary and Philosophical Society, the Portico Library and the Royal Manchester Institution.

Partly as a result of his social concerns, Worthington was often commissioned to design public buildings, ranging from public baths and hospitals to workhouses and Unitarian churches. These were often designed in a Gothic style, not dissimilar to that of his contemporary and rival Alfred Waterhouse.

Projects in Manchester and district
Estate Exchange, Overseers and Churchwardens Office, 46 Fountain Street (1852–1859); listed Grade II*
Greengate Baths, Collier Street (1856)
Mayfield Baths (1857–1940)
Albert Memorial (1862–1867)
The Memorial Hall, Albert Square (1863–1866)
City Police Courts, Manchester (1867–1873).
Chorlton Union Workhouse, afterwards Withington Hospital (1865)
Prestwich Union Infirmary, afterwards Delaunays Hospital (1866–1870)
The Towers, Didsbury (1868–1872), home to Manchester industrialist Daniel Adamson from 1874, this building was later (from 1920) used by the British Cotton Industry Research Association, later called the Shirley Institute
Brookfield Unitarian Church, Gorton (1870)
Monton Green Unitarian Church, Monton, Eccles (1875)
Flowery Field Church, Newton Street, Hyde (1876–1878)
Ellen Wilkinson High School, Ardwick, formerly Nicholl's Hospital (1879–1880)
Dovecote, Sale Old Hall (1880)
Arlington House, Salford, home to Kenworthy's Chambers (1880)
Peacock Mausoleum, Gorton (1890)
Diamond Jubilee Memorial Fountain, Albert Square (1896–1897)
Dunham Road Unitarian Chapel, Altrincham
Bloom

Other projects
Unitarian Chapel, Liverpool
Garlands Hospital, Carlisle (originally the Cumberland and Westmorland Lunatic Asylum, 1862)
Royal Albert Edward Infirmary (1870)
Sutton Oaks (a country house), London Road, Macclesfield, Cheshire (1875)
Rosslyn Hill Unitarian Chapel, Hampstead, added north aisle and chancel (1885)
Manchester College, Oxford (1889–1893)
Royal Bath Hospital, Harrogate
Royal Infirmary, Halifax

Legacy
His sons also trained as architects and worked in the family firm, Thomas Worthington & Sons. Hubert, later Sir Hubert Worthington (1886–1963) trained with Sir Edwin Lutyens and was professor of architecture at the Royal College of Art before becoming Slade lecturer in architecture at Oxford University. Percy Worthington (1864–1939), also worked for the firm.

Thomas Worthington lies buried at the churchyard of the Victorian gothic Brookfield Unitarian Church, Gorton, Manchester.

References
Notes

1826 births
1909 deaths
19th-century English architects
Architects from Greater Manchester
English ecclesiastical architects
Gothic Revival architects
People from Salford